The 1924–25 Drexel Blue and Gold men's basketball team represented Drexel Institute of Art, Science and Industry during the 1924–25 men's basketball season. The Blue and Gold, led by 3rd year head coach Harvey O'Brien, played their home games at Main Building.

Roster

Schedule

|-
!colspan=9 style="background:#F8B800; color:#002663;"| Regular season
|-

References

Drexel Dragons men's basketball seasons
Drexel
1924 in sports in Pennsylvania
1925 in sports in Pennsylvania